Aleš Berger (born 18 September 1946) is a Slovene writer, translator and literary critic.

Berger was born in Ljubljana in 1946. He studied comparative literature and French at the University of Ljubljana and worked as an editor and theatre critic. He is known for his translations into Slovene from French (Lautréamont, Apollinaire, Beckett, René Char, Raymond Queneau and Jacques Prévert) and Spanish (Jorge Luis Borges).  
 
In 1987 he received the Prešeren Foundation Award for his translation of Les Chants de Maldoror. In 1998 he received the Rožanc Award for Krokiji in beležke (Sketches and Notes). 
 
In February 2017, he received the Prešeren Award for lifetime achievement in translation. In particular, he has translated eminent French writers and poets, his favourite being the poet Jacques Prévert (1900–1977).

Published works

 Omara v kleti (Drawer in the Cellar), essay, 2010
 Zmenki (Dates), drama, 2006
 Zagatne zgodbe (Embarrassing Tales), short stories, 2004
 Krokiji in beležke (Sketches and Notes), essays, 1998
 Novi ogledi in pogledi (New Views and Viewings), theatre criticisms, 1997
 Ogledi in pogledi (Views and Viewings), theatre criticisms, 1984
 Gledališki besednjak (A Theatrical Glossary), 1981
 Dadaizem in nadrealizem (Dadaism and Surrealism), 1981

References

Writers from Ljubljana
Slovenian translators
Slovenian literary critics
Living people
1946 births
University of Ljubljana alumni
Prešeren Award laureates